This is a list of all transactions occurring in the 1999–2000 NBA season.

Retirement

Head coaches
1999-2000 NBA season

Trades

Released

Signings

Waived

Draft

1st Round

2nd round

External links
Basketball.RealGM.com
Basketball-Reference.com

References

Transactions
1999-2000